Halesia (tetraptera var.) monticola, the mountain silverbell, is a species of flowering plant in the small family Styracaceae. This large deciduous shrub was originally included in H. carolina, but was identified first as a subspecies by Rehder in 1914, then as a species by Sargent in 1921. More recently, some authoritative sources regard it only as a subspecies or variety, while other authoritative sources regard it as a species, as it is treated here.

Description
H. monticola is much larger than either the little silverbell or common silverbell (var. tetraptera), and is the largest member of the genus. It is known to grow 34 meters tall in the Great Smoky Mountains. Another important difference is that monticola has significantly larger flowers than either H. carolina or H. tetraptera.

Range
The silverbell tree grows mostly in the southern Appalachian Mountains and into southern Alabama and Georgia, with small outlying populations up to and barely north of the Ohio River, and along the Oklahoma-Arkansas border. It is apparently absent from Mississippi and Louisiana. In the cited reference, this species is referred to as Halesia carolina.

Cultivation
The mountain silverbell is cultivated in many places around the world. Although it may be difficult to transplant, once established it is easy to grow. It blooms while still quite small, only about 4 meters tall.

References

monticola
Trees of the Southeastern United States
Flora of the Appalachian Mountains
Natural history of the Great Smoky Mountains